Keiferia powelli is a moth in the family Gelechiidae. It was described by Povolný in 2004. It is found in North America, where it has been recorded from California.

References

Keiferia
Moths described in 2004
Taxa named by Dalibor Povolný